Richard Yearwood is a British-Canadian actor, television host, director and producer, who is best known for providing the voice of Donkey Kong in Donkey Kong Country.

Career
Yearwood began his acting career in 1980, in the television series The Littlest Hobo as Danny McLean. His other recurring roles include, Special Agent Bush in Due South, Mr. Smith in Once a Thief, Jor in Relic Hunter, Nestov in Tracker and Benjamin N'Udu in InSecurity.

He also acted in several feature and television films, such as Vincent in Unnatural Causes, Wilson Carlisle in X-Rated, Marco in Down in the Delta, Habersham in Enslavement: The True Story of Fanny Kemble, Randy Benson in Bojangles and Lucius in Blizzard.

Yearwood had also provided occasional voice over work in animated television shows and video games, most notably the Nintendo character Donkey Kong in the Canadian animated television series Donkey Kong Country, he also voiced Rick in Dino Crisis, J.T. in Swamp Thing and voiced T-Bear in Blood Brothers.

In video games, he did the sounds for Rick in the Dino coliseum unlockable mini-game, but was uncredited. He also voiced President Hamilton in True Crime: New York City and Stilwater's Resident in Saints Row.

He was also the television host of the reality television series Date with Design and was the co-host of the television series Love by Design.

Outside of acting, Yearwood has also worked as a director and producer. He has directed and produced various television shows such as Restaurant Makeover, Marriage Under Construction, Fashion File Host Hunt, Gods of Accident and 
Love It or List It.

Filmography

Film

Television

Video games

Creative staff
 Restaurant Makeover (2006–2007) - Director
 Green Force (2006) - Director
 Marriage Under Construction (2007) - Director, associate producer
 Fashion File Host Hunt (2007) - Director, producer
 Gods of Accident (2010) - Executive producer, producer
 My Generation (2012) - Director
 Shannon & Sophie (2014) - Director
 Love It or List It (2014–2019) - Director
 Rock, Paper, Scissors (2021) - Director, producer

References

External links
 

Canadian male film actors
Canadian male television actors
Canadian male video game actors
Canadian male voice actors
English male film actors
English male television actors
English male video game actors
English male voice actors
20th-century English male actors
21st-century English male actors
Living people
Black British male actors
Black Canadian male actors
Canadian people of Nigerian descent
English people of Nigerian descent
Year of birth missing (living people)